Rockhausen is a village and a former municipality in the district Ilm-Kreis, in Thuringia, Germany. Since December 2019, it is part of the municipality Amt Wachsenburg.

References

Ilm-Kreis
Schwarzburg-Sondershausen
Former municipalities in Thuringia